Asarta is a genus of snout moths. It was erected by Philipp Christoph Zeller in 1848 and is known from Switzerland, Spain, India and Turkey.

Species
 Asarta aethiopella (Duponchel, 1837)
 Asarta albarracinella Leraut & Luquet, 1991
 Asarta alpicolella (Zeller, 1839)
 Asarta alticola (Hampson, 1930)
 Asarta ciliciella Staudinger, 1879
 Asarta fuliginosa (Turner, 1941)

References

Phycitini
Pyralidae genera